"De Ghumaa Ke", is a song composed by the trio of Shankar–Ehsaan–Loy (Shankar Mahadevan, Ehsaan Noorani and Loy Mendonsa) and has been sung by Shankar Mahadevan and Divya Kumar. It is the official song for the 2011 Cricket World Cup. It was released worldwide on 31 December 2010. The song has three different versions in Hindi, Bengali and Sinhalese, as Bangladesh, India  and Sri Lanka co-hosted the event. The Bengali version, "Mar Ghuriye" of the song has been sung by Raghab Chatterjee and Sinhalese version, "Sinha Udane" by Ranidu Lankage. The song has been marketed and managed by Ogilvy and Mather.

Background and composition

"De Ghumaa Ke" literally means "Swing It Hard". The song's lyrics were written by Manoj Yadav.

"We were looking at various ideas to determine what direction we can take because we wanted to make a fun song, a dhamaal song on which people can dance, they can sing and we wanted to use more of a colloquial term, which was an idea that came in late. Initially, we were looking at a regular dance song and by chance we coined this phrase De Ghuma Ke. Everyone got excited and said why not make a song around the phrase," said Shankar.

The song uses Hindi colloquialisms like aare paare ("this way or that") and juta hausla badla faisla ("buck up and change the game"), and has a rousing quality. It incorporates an array of Indian rhythms, as well as elements of rock and hip-hop. The song, according to the composers, avoids both the cliches of patriotism and run-of-the-mill Bollywood beats for a "fun and funky tune" with a "folksy feel and a hint of rustic Punjabi".

Each member has brought in the song his own unique talent and experience, combining the Carnatic and Hindustani vocal tradition, Western rock, fusion and synthesiser techniques.

Reception
There was a lot of buzz about the song before it was released. Within two days of its release, it received nearly 7,000 hits on YouTube. In the next 30 days, over 0.5 million people listened to the song on YouTube.

The song became quite popular among youths and cricket enthusiasts within days of its release.

References

Cricket events official songs and anthems
2010 songs
Songs with music by Shankar–Ehsaan–Loy
2011 Cricket World Cup